Nico van der Vlies (born 11 October 1972) is a Dutch former speed skater. He competed in two events at the 1994 Winter Olympics.

References

External links
 

1972 births
Living people
Dutch male speed skaters
Olympic speed skaters of the Netherlands
Speed skaters at the 1994 Winter Olympics
People from Zijpe
Sportspeople from North Holland